Michael Baiamonte is an American professional basketball announcer. He is the current public address voice of the National Basketball Association's Miami Heat, a position he has held since 1990.

Career
In addition to being the Heat's public address announcer, Baiamonte has hosted several events for various organizations and corporations as an emcee. Such organizations he has emceed for include Top Rank Boxing, Ritz-Carlton, Hilton Hotels, Nike, and Miami-Dade County Public Schools. Nevertheless, Baiamonte is best known for being the arena voice for the Heat. He has seen his team make six appearances in the NBA Finals, winning the NBA Championship in 2006, 2012, and 2013. The Miami media has praised his unique style and creativity, referring to him as "One of the Most Recognizable Voices in the South Florida Sports Market". Baiamonte has also received recognition from national media outlets, such as USA Today, who referred to his "Good Mourning!" call for an Alonzo Mourning dunk as "The best call by a Public Address Announcer".

His style includes stretching long vowels for trademark phrases. An example is the game introduction of  "And Now Stand Up and make some Noise...For your Miami Heat!" Some of Baiamonte's other signature calls include, "Too Many Steps!", "Three!", and at two minutes left in a quarter, "Two minutes... Dos! Minutos!".

On May 10, 2012, the Miami Heat publicly apologized for a call that Baiamonte made during a playoff game against the New York Knicks. In Game 2 of the series, Knicks forward Amar'e Stoudemire injured his left hand when he punched a fire-extinguisher case. In Game 5, Baiamonte announced Stoudemire had been "extinguished" when he was disqualified with his sixth foul.

Last night at our game, our PA Announcer had a momentary lapse of judgment and used a poor choice of words in describing Amar'e Stoudemire's fouling out of the game. This is not who we are as an organization or who he is as an announcer. Both the Miami Heat and Michael Baiamonte apologize to Amar'e and the New York Knicks for the inappropriate choice of words.

Personal life
Baiamonte and his wife, Natalie, have 3 daughters and live in Miami, Florida.

References

External links
Baiamonte profile

Year of birth missing (living people)
Place of birth missing (living people)
Living people
Miami Heat
National Basketball Association public address announcers
People from Palmetto Bay, Florida
Gulliver Preparatory School alumni
Sportspeople from Miami-Dade County, Florida